Marco Königs (born 25 January 1990) is a German professional footballer who plays for Wuppertaler SV.

References

External links
 
 Marco Königs at kicker 

1990 births
Living people
Association football forwards
German footballers
Fortuna Düsseldorf players
SC Preußen Münster players
SV Wehen Wiesbaden players
SSV Jahn Regensburg players
Würzburger Kickers players
FC Hansa Rostock players
Wuppertaler SV players
2. Bundesliga players
3. Liga players
People from Solingen
Sportspeople from Düsseldorf (region)
Footballers from North Rhine-Westphalia